London Midland and Scottish Railway's number 5552 (British Railways' number 45552), named Silver Jubilee was a Jubilee Class 4-6-0 express steam locomotive.  It was specially named for the Silver Jubilee of George V.

Overview 
The original 5552 was the first of the class that emerged in June 1934 from Crewe Works (Maker's number: 63 Lot Number: 97).  The original 5552 however swapped identities with classmate 5642 in April 1935 (built December 1934 Crewe, Makers Number: 203 Lot Number: 112, later named Boscawen).  5552 was given a special livery of all over black (it originally had been, like the rest of the class, painted crimson lake) with silver lining and specially cast chrome numbers and named Silver Jubilee to mark the silver jubilee of George V.  This scheme was retained until the 1948 nationalization by British Railways. The rest of its class were thereafter officially known as the Jubilee Class.

It originally had a low degree superheat domeless boiler but received a high degree superheat domed boiler in 1940.  The loco was allocated to several LMS depots during its service, including Longsight, Manchester, in 1947/48, from where it ran on express trains to London Euston and other destinations. It was renumbered 45552 in 1951, receiving new cast numbers.  It was also given a livery of Brunswick green during the 1950s.  45552 was withdrawn in September 1964, and scrapped at Cashmores, Great Bridge.

Preservation 
Although 5552 was not preserved, it has been represented in preservation.  In 1994 classmate 5593 Kolhapur was disguised as 5552 in original livery to mark the silver jubilee of the preserved Great Central Railway.  In 2003, another preserved Jubilee, 5690 Leander was temporarily renamed Golden Jubilee for the Golden Jubilee of George V's granddaughter HM Queen Elizabeth II, though retaining the crimson lake livery.

See also 
 Silver Jubilee (train)

External links 
 Jubilees page
 Railuk database

Silver Jubilee of George V
5552 Silver Jubilee
Scrapped locomotives
Standard gauge steam locomotives of Great Britain